Richard John Koch (born 28 July 1950 in London) is a British management consultant, venture capital investor and author of books on management, marketing and lifestyle.

Career 
Koch has an M.A. from Oxford University and an M.B.A. from The Wharton School. Initially Koch worked as a consultant with the Boston Consulting Group. Subsequently he became a partner at Bain and Company. After leaving Bain in 1983 he co-founded L.E.K. Consulting with Iain Evans and James Lawrence.

Businesses owned by Koch have included Filofax, Plymouth Gin, Belgo Restaurants, Betfair, FanDuel, and Auto1.

Publications 

The 80/20 Principle.  Nicholas Brealey Publishing, 1997, Doubleday 1998. 
The Power Laws. Nicholas Brealey Publishing, 2000, published in the US as The Natural Laws of Business, Doubleday 2001. 
Translated into German by Birgit Schöbitz as Der 80/20-Entscheider Der Königsweg zur Effektivität und persönlichen Freiheit
Translated into French as  Le principe 80 : faire plus avec moins
translated into Chinese as 業競天擇 : 站上巨人肩膀的十七項成功法則 = The power laws : the science of success
Translated into Thai by  Khomsan Khačhō̜nchīpphanngām.; Kānsudā Mākhasirānon  as ปั้นธุรกิจเงินล้าน ! / Pan thurakit ngœ̄n lān!
Translated into Polish by Grzegorz Łuczkiewicz  as Zasada 80/20 : lepsze efekty mniejszym nakładem sił i środków
Translated into Turkish by   Kerem Özdemir; Osman Deniztekin as 80/20 ilkesi
Translated into Vietnamese by Nguyễn Minh Thọ Lê; Hớn Huy Trương as Nguyên lý 80/20 : bí quyết làm ít được nhiều
Translated into Spanish  as El principio del 80/20 : el secreto de lograr más con menos
Translated into Korean by Sŏng-yŏn Ko  as 	스타 비즈니스 법칙 / Sŭt'a bijŭnisŭ pŏpch'ik
The 80/20 Revolution. Nicholas Brealey Publishing, 2002, published in the US as The 80/20 Individual, Doubleday, 2003. 
Living the 80/20 Way. Nicholas Brealey Publishing, 2004. 
Superconnect: the power of networks and the strength of weak links.  Little, Brown/WW Norton, 2010. .
The Star Principle: How It Can Make You Rich. Piatkus Books, 2010, 
Financial Times Guide to management''' : Financial Times Prentice Hall, 2013.   Copies in 243 libraries, according to WorldCat The 80/20 Manager: Ten ways to become a Great Leader. Piatkus/Little Brown, 2013 The 80/20 Principle and 92 Other Powerful Laws of Nature: The Science of Success''. Nicholas Brealey Publishing, 2014.  & 
Simplify (with Greg Lockwood) London : Piatkus, 2018.

References

External links

 http://www.richardkoch.net
Nicholas Brealey Publishing
BoingBoing.net Interview with Richard Koch

Living people
1950 births
Writers from London
Alumni of Wadham College, Oxford
Wharton School of the University of Pennsylvania alumni
British business theorists
British economics writers
British finance and investment writers
British management consultants